Lisa Saltzman is an American photographer known for both her commercial and fine art photography.

Career
Saltzman began her photographic career running an advertising and promotional merchandise company in which she created much of the work she produced. Her affinity for the arts was inspired by her parents who are passionate collectors and art patrons. Later on, she studied contemporary arts at Christie's and the International Center for Photography, helping influence some of her fine art work that would come. She has had a successful commercial photography career, even being elected a Board Member of the New York chapter of the American Photographic Artists. Her commercial clients include The Guggenheim Museum, Estée Lauder, MAC Cosmetics, Rimmel, and HBO. Some of Saltzman's work is also a part of the Cleveland Clinics permanent art collection.

Fine Art Series
City Anonymity B&W (2016) – abstract, anonymous portraits of NYC dwellers caught in motion 
City Anonymity Color (2016) – abstract, anonymous portraits of NYC dwellers caught in motion 
Portraits (2016) – dark, moody staged portraits of various models 
Translucent (2016) – abstract street photography shot through translucent materials to create various levels of obfuscation

Awards
2019 – 1st Place, Outstanding Achievement – International Color Awards – Fine Art, Professional
2019 – Nominee – International Color Awards – Abstract, Professional
2018 – Honorable Mention – Monochrome Photography Awards – Portrait, Professional 
2018 – Honorable Mention – Monochrome Photography Awards – Abstract, Professional 
2018 – Honorable Mention – Monochrome Photography Awards – Abstract, Professional 
2018 – Honorable Mention – Monochrome Photography Awards – Abstract, Professional 
2018 – Honorable Mention – Monochrome Photography Awards – Abstract, Professional 
2018 – Honorable Mention – IPA One Shot Photo Contest – Fine Art, Abstract Professional
2018 – Honorable Mention – IPA One Shot Photo Contest – Fine Art, Abstract Professional
2018 – Honorable Mention – IPA One Shot Photo Contest – Fine Art, Abstract Professional
2018 – 2nd Place, Merit of Excellence – 13th B&W Spider Awards, Abstract Professional 
2018 – Nominee – 13th B&W Spider Awards, Abstract Professional 
2018 – Nominee – 13th B&W Spider Awards, Abstract Professional 
2018 – Top Rated Photographer – LensCulture Street Photography Awards
2018 – Honorable Mention – International Photography Awards, Fine Art (Abstract) Professional 
2018 – Honorable Mention – International Photography Awards, Fine Art (Abstract) Professional 
2018 – Honorable Mention – International Photography Awards, Fine Art (Abstract) Professional 
2018 – Book Selection – One Eyeland Best of The Best Photographers
2018 – Web Exhibition Selected Photographer – The Photo Review
2018 – Competition Shortlist – Communication Arts 2018 Photography Competition
2017 – Honorable Mention – Tokyo International Foto Awards, Fine Art Professional
2017 – Honorable Mention – Tokyo International Foto Awards, Fine Art Professional
2017 – Finalist – One Eyeland Awards, Professional (Fine Art & Abstract)
2017 – Honorable Mention – International Photography Awards, Advertising (Fashion & Product) Professional 
2017 – Honorable Mention – Prix de la Photographie Px3, Fine Art Professional 
2017 – Honorable Mention – Neutral Density Photography Awards, Fine Art Abstract Professional 
2016 – Honor of Distinction (3rd place) – 12th B&W Spider Awards, Fine Art Professional 
2016 – Honorable Mention – 12th B&W Spider Awards, Fine Art Professional 
2016 – Nominee – 12th B&W Spider Awards, Fine Art Professional 
2016 – Honorable Mention – Monochrome Photography Awards, Fine Art Professional

Exhibitions

Group Shows
2017 – Group Show, LemoArt Gallery, Berlin, Germany
2017 – Photography Now, Brick Lane Gallery, London, UK
2017 – ArtExpo 2017, Pier 94, New York, NY
2016 – Shadow and Light, Darkroom Gallery, Essex Jct., VT
2016 – Black + White 2016, Center for Fine Art Photography, Fort Collins, CO

Publications
2018 – Solitary Figures: Artist Lisa Saltzman’s Transmuted & Transitory Take on Street Photography, Bellus Magazine, USA
2018 – Lisa Saltzman’s Decisive Moment, Art of the Times, USA
2018 – Artist Lisa Saltzman Captures A 'Memory Never Fully Known' with Her Street Photography, JustLuxe, USA
2018 – Lisa Saltzman’s unfamiliar and anonymous people, L’Oeil de la Photographie, FR
2017 – Photo Annual 2017, American Society of Media Photographers New York, USA
2016 – Proof Sheet Fall 2016, American Photographic Artists New York, USA

References

Year of birth missing (living people)
Living people
American women photographers
Artists from New York City
American businesspeople
Photographers from New York (state)
21st-century American women